Franz Schrönghamer-Heimdal (born July 12, 1881 in Marbach Eppenschlag, Lower Bavaria - died 3 September 1962 in Passau), was a Bavarian Catholic writer and painter.

References

External links
 

1881 births
1962 deaths